Katulu Ravi Kumar (born 24 April 1988) is an Indian weightlifter from Odisha. At the 2010 Commonwealth Games, he won a gold medal in the Men's  weightlifting category.

K. Ravi Kumar hails from Berhampur in Odisha. He started weightlifting at the Veer Hanuman Club in the city. K. Ravi Kumar was originally a bodybuilder for 7 years before he took up weightlifting. However, after his trainer Narayan Sahu's counsel he changed his attention towards weightlifting, which at last made him an outstanding performer.

K. Ravi Kumar won many State, National, and International awards in this short span of time. He won 3 gold medals in 2009 Commonwealth Games held at Penang, Malaysia. Then in 2010, he won 3 gold medals at the New Delhi Commonwealth Games. In 2011, he won 3 bronze medals in senior weightlifting championship at Tongling, China. He also won 3 gold medals in senior weightlifting championship held at Bangalore. K. Ravi Kumar now works with Indian Army.

He competed for India at the 2012 Summer Olympics, and won a silver at the 2014 Commonwealth Games in the 69 kg division.  His lifts were 142 kg in the snatch and 17h kg in the clean and jerk for a total of 317 kg.  He came in second to fellow Indian weightlifter Sathish Sivalingam, who set a new Games record to win.

References 

Indian male weightlifters
1988 births
Living people
Commonwealth Games gold medallists for India
Weightlifters at the 2010 Commonwealth Games
Olympic weightlifters of India
Weightlifters at the 2012 Summer Olympics
Weightlifters from Odisha
Recipients of the Arjuna Award
Weightlifters at the 2010 Asian Games
Weightlifters at the 2014 Commonwealth Games
Commonwealth Games silver medallists for India
Weightlifters at the 2014 Asian Games
Commonwealth Games medallists in weightlifting
Asian Games competitors for India
20th-century Indian people
21st-century Indian people
Medallists at the 2014 Commonwealth Games